The Reckoning is the fourth studio album from American Christian rock band Needtobreathe, released on September 20, 2011, through Atlantic Records. It is the last album featuring drummer Joe Stillwell. It debuted at No. 1 on the Billboard Christian Album chart, No. 1 on the Billboard Rock Albums chart, No. 4 on the Billboard Digital Albums chart and No. 6 on the Billboard 200 chart, selling 49,000 copies in its first week. The song "Oohs and Ahhs" was used in a promotional advertisement for J. J. Abrams's drama television series Alcatraz.

Background
The album released on September 20, 2011, through Atlantic Records, and it was produced by Needtobreathe, Rick Beato, and Greg Wells. This was the fourth studio album by the band. The studios used while recording the album were Plantation Studios in Charleston, South Carolina, Blackbird Studios in Nashville, Tennessee and Rocket Carousel Studios in Los Angeles, California.

Music and lyrics
At Allmusic, Andrew Leahey stated that the album was a mixture of "sacred/secular" that is done with great precision, which takes the "best from both camps." Cross Rhythms' John Willoughby agrees with that noting the band "successfully managed the balancing act of having a foot in both the mainstream and Christian rock worlds." Matt Conner of CCM Magazine wrote that this was an album that "the sweet Southern Rock...captures the attention of all who hear it." At Christian Music Zine, Adrian Garza affirmed that listeners "enjoy music that sounds completely original, and unlike most of what they’ve ever heard", which the band do on the release. Jeremy V. Jones of Christianity Today said that the band has come "out guitars blazing on its fourth album, a muscular collection ready to shake arenas but paint their corners with warm southern and Americana gentility". Willoughby also believed strongly that this is the reason for the band's "huge appeal comes from the fact that they also straddle musical styles and can switch from tender alt-folk to swaggering pop rock."

Jen Rose of Jesus Freak Hideout noted that the album "doesn't retread past material or stick to a formula", however, she stated that "something feels a little off on the first listen or two. Perhaps it's the darker, subdued feel overall that is unsettling at first, or maybe it's the lack of standout upbeat songs". In addition, Jesus Freak Hideout's Jerold Wallace agreed that this album was just not "retreading" the same stuff all over again, but does have "Like the past albums, each piece borrows heavily from southern influences with a firm rock foundation." Also, Wallace noted how "Bear consistently impresses, be it with emotional highs that evolve into growls or a falsetto that we have not heard much of before." This was why Louder Than the Music's Jono Davies noted this album was "creative indie rock at its best." At Rock News and Reviews, Alexandre Romero said the album was "a balanced mix between genres already experienced during their career performed better than ever, plus some innovation touches."

Leahey noted that the album sound like "14 tracks are full of Bible allusions and parable-like lyrics." The Christian Manifesto's Lydia Akinola subscribed to the belief that this album "reads like a series of intimate thoughts put to poetry. More than the music, powerful lines hold the album together." In the thematic area, Akinola said that the album has "running theme[s] of redemption and grace that permeates" every part of the music.

Critical reception
{{Album ratings
|rev1 = AllMusic
|rev1score = 
|rev2 = CCM Magazine
|rev2score = 
|rev3 = The Christian Manifesto
|rev3score = 
|rev4 = Christian Music Zine
|rev4score = 
|rev5 = Christianity Today
|rev5score = 
|rev6 = Cross Rhythms
|rev6score = 
|rev7 = Jesus Freak Hideout
|rev7score = 
|rev8 = Louder Than the Music
|rev8score= 
|rev9 = Melodic
|rev9score= <ref name=net>{{cite web|url=http://www.melodic.net/?page=review&id=10267|title=Needtobreathe - The Reckoning|last=Wippsson|first=Johan|date=September 20, 2011|publisher=Melodic|accessdate=January 8, 2012}}</ref>
|rev10 = New Release Tuesday
|rev10score = 
|rev11 = Rock News and Reviews|rev11score = 
}}The Reckoning garnered critical acclaim from music critics. Leahey of Allmusic rated the album four stars, and noted that the album is full of "big music" that the band "have the balls and brawn to pull it off well." At CCM Magazine, Conner rated the album four stars, and stated that the album "offers proof positive that this South Carolina train isn't slowing anytime soon." The Christian Manifesto's Akinola rated the album four-and-a-half stars, and highlighted that the band have "pulled out all the stops – with magnificent results. It is hard not to be impressed, even when really; you weren’t expecting not to be." Garza of Christian Music Zine rated the album four stars, and brought up the "it" factor, which he said no one exactly knows what that is, "but what I do know is that this record has loads of good songs, and is one of the closest to “it” that I’ve heard in a while."

At Christianity Today, Jeremy V. Jones rated the album four stars, and said the band has "got swagger" but are humble at the same time. Cross Rhythms' John Willoughby rated the album nine squares out of ten, and called the album "A fine set." At Jesus Freak Hideout, Jen Rose rated the album four stars, and stated that the release was "a strong album" full of "intriguing, solid addition[s] to the catalog, even if it doesn't quite have the immediate spark of some of their past work...but for now, it is one worth the time to fully discover, whether as a newcomer or long-time listener." Jesus Freak Hideout's Wallace rated the album four-and-a-half stars, and advised "it may take some listeners a few spins before it settles in, but once it does it's arguably Needtobreathe's finest work to date", which adds "14 more solid entries into their catalog." At Louder Than The Music, Jono Davies rated the album a perfect five stars, and touted the music as "a creative set of songs, showing the world that indie rock can be at times dark, rocky and truthfully honest, but put that with great harmonies, interesting chord structures and savvy musicianship and you get a stunning set of songs for a very sturdy album."

Melodic's Johan Wippsson rated the album four stars, and reasoned that the album was "almost in the same class [as The Outsiders] and to me also surprisingly well. Did not think the band would be able to follow up on "The Outsiders", but this is a very well-written album with a great deal of heart and soul." At New Release Tuesday, Kevin Davis rated the album a perfect five stars, and lauded the band for crafting a "ridiculously fantastic album on all levels. You can be sure this is a 5 star masterpiece that will propel NEEDTOBREATHE to major headliner status just like GRAMMY Award winning bands Train, Kings of Leon and Muse." Kevin McNeese also of New Release Tuesday's rated it the same, and noted the album had a tremendous amount of "passion in these songs is something very much akin to what has been driving [him] to Switchfoot as of late", and he got "absolutely engrossed by this album, and the more [he] unearthed, the more [he] discovered." Rock News and Reviewss Alexandre Romero rated the album four-and-a-half stars, and said of the album that it satisfied the "requests of older fans and returns triumphantly to their roots, but without getting away from the softer sound that pushed them to mainstream in recent years.", and the album was absolutely "An important step to the group towards [getting] critical and commercial acclaim"

Track listing
Original releaseNotes "Cops" and "Disaster Road" included on limited edition vinyl record.
 Currently, the vinyl records are only for sale at the band's concerts.
 The vinyl records are white.
 The parenthesis are what the band called each one of the sides.

 Keep Your Eyes Open EP

 Personnel Needtobreathe Bear Rinehart
 Bo Rinehart
 Seth Bolt
 Joe StillwellProduction'''
 Needtobreathe – producers
 Rick Beato – producer (1-12, 14), engineer (1-12, 14)
 Greg Wells – producer (13)
 Seth Bolt – engineer, mixing (2, 5)
 Ken "Grand" Lanyon – engineer (1-12, 14)
 Ian MacGregor – engineer (13)
 Mark Endert – mixing (1, 3, 6-14)
 Tchad Blake – mixing (4)
 Bo Rinehart – mixing (5), art direction, design
 Leland Elliott – additional engineer
 Randall Harris – additional engineer
 Eric Legg – additional engineer
 Ryan Stukenbroeker – additional engineer
 Ted Jensen – mastering at Sterling Sound (New York, NY)
 Anthony Delia – A&R, marketing 
 Pete Ganbarg – A&R
 Aryanna Platt – A&R administration 
 Joshua Drake – photography
 Kip Krones – management

Charts

Album

Year-end charts

Singles

Tour
The band completed The Reckoning Tour, which included the following stops.

References

External links
 The Reckoning album

2011 albums
Needtobreathe albums
Atlantic Records albums